Davila Plocon (born 28 July 1931, date of death unknown) was a Romanian volleyball player. He competed in the men's tournament at the 1964 Summer Olympics.

References

1931 births
Year of death missing
Romanian men's volleyball players
Olympic volleyball players of Romania
Volleyball players at the 1964 Summer Olympics
Sportspeople from Slatina, Romania